Nestopia UE - and its predecessor Nestopia - are an open-source NES/Famicom emulator designed to emulate the NES hardware as accurately as possible.

Features
The requirements for the original Nestopia were considered higher than some of its contemporaries such as Stella. In order to run an optimal emulation, the program requires a minimum 800 MHz processor. Its high requirement is due to its accurate emulation of the NES hardware. The emulator will play most ROMs and has a strong port for the Apple Macintosh. 

The original Nestopia allowed customization of colors, sounds, and graphics. It includes special features such as Power Glove. Brandon Widdler of Digital Trends considers the emulator one of the best for the NES, though he admits that it has fewer features than its rival FCEUX.

Development history
Nestopia was originally developed for Windows by Martin Freij. Richard Bannister and R. Belmont later ported it to Mac OS X and Linux, respectively. Original development ended in 2008, but forked into Nestopia UE.

See also
 List of NES emulators
 List of Nintendo Entertainment System games

References

External links

Nintendo Entertainment System emulators
MacOS emulation software
Windows emulation software
Linux emulation software
Free video game console emulators